Magasi or Megesi may refer to:
 Magasi, Baft
 Megesi, Jiroft